The Blues Brothers is a book written by Crawdaddy! reporter Miami Mitch (Glazer) and published in 1980.  The novel was based on the original version of The Blues Brothers screenplay written by Dan Aykroyd and John Landis.  However, the original script that was used for the basis of the novel evolved so dramatically into what was used in the film that the two works only scantly resemble each other.

The book contains eight glossy pages of black-and-white stills from the film, two per page.  Scene breaks are marked by two pairs of sunglasses.

This title is currently out of print.

External links 

 Google Books

The Blues Brothers
1980 American novels
Novels based on films
Novels set in Chicago